Olga Anatolyevna Dontsova (born January 7, 1959) is a Russian biochemist and an academician at the Russian Academy of Sciences. Her research interests includes: structure and functions of RNA-containing cellular machines, functional properties and mechanisms of regulation of Telomerase Ribonucleoprotein particle (RNP) complexes and non-coding RNAs.

Education and work
In 1991 she defended her Ph.D. from the Chemistry Department of Moscow State University and in 1997 her doctoral dissertation development of chemical methods for studying the structure and function of complex ribonucleoprotein systems was published. Since 1999 she is the professor of Bio-organic chemistry, Department of Chemistry of Natural Compounds at Faculty of Chemistry, Moscow State University.

She is the member of the Russian Foundation for Basic Research Board.

Selected bibliography

Articles

*

Books

Patents
Telomerase inhibiting composition (2017)
Method for the determination of modified RNA nucleotides (2014)
Telomerase inhibitors and a method for the preparation thereof (2011)

External links
 Profile of Olga Anatolyevna Dontsova on the official website of the RAS

References

Living people
1959 births
Moscow State University alumni
Academic staff of Moscow State University
Russian biochemists
Russian women scientists
Full Members of the Russian Academy of Sciences